Samuel Atkins Eliot Jr. (March 14, 1893 – August 3, 1984) was an American author, born in Denver, Colorado and educated at Harvard University.  He was the son of Samuel Atkins Eliot, a prominent Unitarian clergyman, and the grandson of Charles W. Eliot, a president of Harvard University. Samuel Eliot Jr. wrote books on the theatre and made many translations from the German playwright Frank Wedekind.  His works include Little Theatre Classics (four volumes, (1918–21); Erdgeist (1914); Pandora's Box (1914); and Tragedies of Sex (1923).

External links
 
 
 
 

20th-century American novelists
Harvard University alumni
1893 births
1984 deaths
Eliot family (America)
American male novelists
20th-century American male writers